I Woke Up is the 26th album by Jandek and his only release of 1997. Released as Corwood Industries #0764, it introduced (for the first and last time) a new male vocalist who sings most of the tracks.

Track listing

Reviews

More existential twang, strum, holler, and moan. Of course, a shylock like Will Oldham gets laid a lot when he pulls this trick, so it's patently unfair that Texas recluse Jandek doesn't get those same dumpy groupies. -- Fred Mills Magnet #31

External links
Seth Tisue's I Woke Up review

Jandek albums
Corwood Industries albums
1997 albums